Parasitic Root invasion is the invasion of plant root systems by parasitic pathogens, such as root-knot nematode and other nematodes.

References 

Plant pathogenic nematodes